Lichen Island is a small island lying  north of the Bølingen Islands and  north-west of Cleft Island in southern Prydz Bay, Antarctica. It was first visited by an Australian National Antarctic Research Expeditions party led by Phillip Law, on 5 February 1955, and named by him for the rich growth of lichens found there.

See also 
 List of Antarctic and subantarctic islands

References

Islands of Princess Elizabeth Land